Carrick Hamilton was a Scottish amateur football outside left who played in the Scottish League for Queen's Park and Partick Thistle.

Career statistics

References 

Scottish footballers
Year of death missing
Scottish Football League players
Queen's Park F.C. players
Footballers from North Ayrshire
Association football outside forwards
1881 births
Ardeer Thistle F.C. players
Petershill F.C. players
People from Stevenston
Scottish Junior Football Association players